Adèle Charvet, (born 1983) is a French mezzo-soprano.

Life 
Born in Montpellier, Charvet lived in New-York for up to five years. There, with the soprano Mariamielle Lamagat, the tenor Mathys Lagier and the baritone Edwin Fardini, she founded the vocal quartet "L'Archipel", which is invited in residence at the 

She was nominated in 2020 at the Victoires de la musique classique in the "Revelation, lyric artist" category.

She composed a noted Mélisande for her role in the Rouen Opera House production broadcast on 26 January 2021 on the Norman TV Channel.

Family 
Charvet is the daughter of the composer  and the sportswoman Nadine Éwanjé-Épée. She considers the poet Frédéric Jacques Temple as her grandfather since the latter had a very long love and artistic relationship with Brigitte Portal, her paternal grandmother. Her maternal grandfather, Charles Éwanjé-Épée, is a musician and composer of Cameroonian origin.

Prizes 
 2015 : Prix de mélodie du  with pianist Florian Caroubi.
 2016 : Prix Eugène Pannebakker Lied Duo, Dioraphte Composition Award, Prix de la presse, Prix du jury junior et MAX Young Talent Award, at the International Vocal Competition 's-Hertogenbosch avec le pianiste Florian Caroubi
 2017 : Prix d'honneur au Verbier Festival

References

External links 
 

French operatic mezzo-sopranos
Conservatoire de Paris alumni
1993 births
Living people
Musicians from Montpellier